Appapuramis a village in Nadendla Mandal of Guntur district, Andhra Pradesh, India. Appapuram has Nadendla, Kavuru, Ganapavaram etc. surrounding it.

Majority of people have farming as their primary profession. However, there are many Engineers and IT professionals from this place working for top notch companies in India and abroad.

People from Appapuram construct a big electric prabha to Kotappakonda every year for the eve of Maha Shivaratri. A Prabha is a very tall structure with thousands of electric lights supported by a wooden skeleton inside.

Geography

Language 

Telugu is the main language of communication here.

Festivals, culture 

Festivals celebrated are Maha Shivaratri, Sankranthi, Dipavali (Diwali), Dasara (Vijayadasami), Sriramanavami, Vinayaka Chavithi (Ganesh chaturthi), Ramjaan (Ramadan), Karthika Pournami, Christmas etc.

Shri Ganga Parvathi sametha Chandramouleeswara devasthanam was initially rocked in 1982 and there was a prathishta and Dwajasthambha sthaapana in the year 2000.

Lifestyle 
The lifestyle is a mixture of both urban and rural but with little cosmopolitan element. with the advent of Internet, youth now have access to all the news and events that happens all over the world.

Economy 
The economical development happening in the village is significant from around the year 2005, compared to the past.

Farming and Vegetation
Farm lands
The village has a very fertile land in the region. Chilies, Cotton, Paddy tobacco and other crops grow here very well.

Transportation

Roadways 
Common modes of road transport here are cars, motorcycles, buses, and auto-rickshaws;
The village is connected very well to Guntur, Vijayawada and Ongole by road.
The place is around 8 km off the National Highway no. 5 (Kolkata - Chennai).this village placed at chilakaluripet to narasarao pet route.8 km to chilakaluript and 16 km to narasarao pet.

If you want to see Appapuram in google maps, Pls search for "Appapuram nadendla" or "Appapuram 522611". If you try just Appapuram, we are unnecessarily making the other Appapuram more popular on Google maps.

Someone please make the necessary contribution to make our place popular on Google maps. by adding more details and places like library, Panchayat office etc. to the map, and marking them as inside "Appapuram, Andhrapradesh". Thank you for that.

Rail connectivity 
The nearest railway station is Narasarao pet.
The place is around 20 km from the railway line connecting Kolkata and Chennai.

Nearest airport 
The nearest Airport is Gannavaram, Vijayawada.

Villages in Guntur district